The Players Tour Championship 2011/2012 – Event 11 was a professional minor-ranking snooker tournament that took place between 17 and 19 December 2011 at the English Institute of Sport in Sheffield, England. The preliminary round took place on 10 December at the World Snooker Academy. The main round matches were split between the World Snooker Academy and the Badminton Hall of the venue. One table was broadcast on Eurosport. Despite being held in England, the event counted towards the Order of Merit as a European event.

Ding Junhui made the 84th official maximum break during his last 128 match against James Cahill. This was Ding's fourth 147 break and his second within three days. The next day Jamie Cope made the 85th official maximum break in the last 32 against Kurt Maflin. This was Cope's third 147 break.

Tom Ford wins his second professional title by defeating Martin Gould 4–3 in the final.

Prize fund and ranking points
The breakdown of prize money and ranking points of the event is shown below: 

1 Only professional players can earn ranking points.

Main draw

Preliminary round

Best of 7 frames

Main rounds

Top half

Section 1

Section 2

Section 3

Section 4

Bottom half

Section 5

Section 6

Section 7

Section 8

Finals

Century breaks

 147, 135, 110  Ding Junhui
 147, 133, 111  Jamie Cope
 141, 132, 106  Ian McCulloch
 140, 124  Judd Trump
 140  Marco Fu
 140  Michael Holt
 139, 132, 117, 130  Tom Ford
 139, 130, 127, 115, 103, 103  Martin Gould
 139  Steve Davis
 137  Paul Davison
 136, 103  Alan McManus
 136  Ricky Walden
 129, 115  David Gilbert
 128  Mark Selby
 127  Graeme Dott
 124, 123  Anthony Hamilton
 123, 105, 101  Simon Bedford
 122  James Wattana
 121  Mark Allen
 119  Michael White

 118  Ben Woollaston
 117  Tony Drago
 114, 105  Mark Davis
 113  Xiao Guodong
 113  Dave Harold
 112, 101  Dominic Dale
 112  Stuart Bingham
 109, 103  Duane Jones
 105, 104  Andrew Higginson
 104  Chen Zhe
 102  Luca Brecel
 102  Barry Hawkins
 102  Fergal O'Brien
 101  Stephen Maguire
 101  Kurt Maflin
 101  Nigel Bond
 100  Marcus Campbell
 100  Stephen Hendry
 100  Jamie Jones

References

External links

11
2011 in English sport
PTC11